Andrew J. Baker is an American astrophysicist.

After completing a Bachelor of Arts degree in  mathematics and physics at Harvard University, he completed a doctorate in astronomy at the California Institute of Technology. In 2006, Baker joined the faculty of Rutgers University. Baker was elected a fellow of the American Association for the Advancement of Science in 2014.

References

Fellows of the American Association for the Advancement of Science
American astrophysicists
Rutgers University faculty
California Institute of Technology alumni
Harvard College alumni
Year of birth missing (living people)
Living people